Josh Robinson may refer to:

Josh Robinson (cornerback) (born 1991), American football cornerback
Josh Robinson (running back) (born 1992), American football running back
Josh Robinson (basketball) (born 1996), American professional basketball player

See also 
Joshua Robinson (born 1985), Australian javelin thrower